Vasilyevsky (masculine), Vasilyevskaya (feminine), or Vasilyevskoye (neuter) may refer to:
Vasilyevsky Municipal Okrug, a municipal okrug of Vasileostrovsky District of the federal city of St. Petersburg, Russia
Vasilyevsky Island, an island in St. Petersburg, Russia
Vasilyevsky (rural locality) (Vasilyevskaya, Vasilyevskoye), name of several rural localities in Russia
Vasilyevsky District, name of Chkalovsky District of Nizhny Novgorod Oblast, Russia, in 1936–1937